The Cleveland Barons were a professional ice hockey team in the National Hockey League (NHL) from 1976 to 1978. They were a relocation of the California Golden Seals franchise that had played in Oakland since 1967. After just two seasons, the team merged with the Minnesota North Stars (now the Dallas Stars). As a result, the NHL operated with 17 teams during the 1978–79 season.

Ohio did not have another NHL team until the Columbus Blue Jackets joined the league 22 years later in 2000.

History

The Barons originated as the California Golden Seals in the 1967 NHL expansion. Based at the Oakland-Alameda Coliseum Arena in Oakland, California; they were the least successful of the six teams added as part of that expansion, both on the ice and off. They never had a winning record and only made the playoffs twice. 

Off the ice, the team was sold three times, and spent much of 1974 and 1975 as wards of the league. The team never drew well; attendance was so poor that talk of relocation began as early as the inaugural season. However, the league's U. S. television contract with CBS required two teams in California, and only the Bay Area and Southern California were nearly large enough to support an NHL team at the time. 

San Francisco hotel magnate Melvin Swig bought the Seals from the league in 1975. Soon afterward, he hammered out a deal with San Francisco Mayor Joseph Alioto to move the Seals to a new 17,000-seat arena in San Francisco. However, when those plans fell through later in 1975, the NHL dropped its remaining objection to moving the team. Minority owner George Gund III persuaded majority owner Melvin Swig to move the team to his hometown of Cleveland for the 1976–77 season. The team was named "Barons" in honor of the successful team in the American Hockey League (AHL) that played in the city from 1929 to 1973, winning nine Calder Cups. The AHL Barons' owner, Nick Mileti, moved that team to Florida in favor of his Cleveland Crusaders team in the new World Hockey Association (WHA).

Cleveland had been mentioned as a possible NHL city as early as 1935, when the then-struggling Montreal Canadiens considered moving there. It had also been turned down for an NHL expansion team on three previous occasions, in the 1950s and 1960s.

The Barons played in the suburban Richfield Coliseum in Richfield, Ohio, halfway between Cleveland and Akron. It had originally been built for the WHA's Crusaders (who left to become the second incarnation of the Minnesota Fighting Saints for the 1976–77 WHA season on the Barons' arrival) and the NBA's Cleveland Cavaliers. At the time, the Richfield Coliseum had the largest seating capacity in the NHL, at 18,544.

The NHL approved the move to Cleveland on July 14, 1976, but details were not finalized until late August, less than six weeks before the season opener. There was little time or money for promotion of the new team, and the Barons never recovered from this lack of visibility. They never came close to filling the Coliseum in their two years in Cleveland. The team's home opener on October 7, 1976, drew only 8,900 fans. They drew 10,000 or more fans in only seven out of 40 home games. Attendance was worse than it had been in Oakland and the team did not even draw as many fans as the WHA's Crusaders had. The Barons were also troubled by an unfavorable lease with the Coliseum.

During the All-Star Break in January 1977, Swig hinted the team might not finish the season because of payroll difficulties. He asked the board of governors for a bailout. The board turned down Swig's request almost out of hand. At the time, no one in the NHL offices believed that the Barons' situation was nearly as dire as Swig claimed. No NHL team had folded since the Montreal Maroons had their franchise formally canceled in 1947 after not icing a team since 1938. No team had folded in mid-season since the Montreal Wanderers disbanded during the NHL's inaugural season in 1917–18 after their arena burned down. The situation quickly deteriorated. Amid $2.4 million in losses, team workers went unpaid for two months. The bottom fell out in February, when Swig asked the players to take a 27 percent pay cut. The players turned this request down, and the team missed two payrolls. The league seriously considered folding the team and holding a dispersal draft for the players; by then, some of the Barons' players were actively being courted by other teams. By February 18, the players had lost their patience, and threatened to not take the ice for their game against the Colorado Rockies. Wanting to avoid the embarrassment of a player strike, as well as a team folding at mid-season (the latter had previously happened in the rival WHA), Swig, the league and the NHLPA reached a last-minute deal to cover the players' salaries for the rest of the season. Swig contributed $350,000, the other 17 owners put up $20,000 each, and the NHLPA loaned the team $600,000. After the team finished last in the Adams Division again, Swig sold his interest to Gund and his brother Gordon.

For 1977–78, the Gunds poured money into the team, and it seemed to make a difference at first. The Barons stunned the defending Stanley Cup champion Montreal Canadiens on November 23 before a boisterous crowd of 12,859. After a brief slump, general manager Harry Howell pulled off several trades in an attempt to make the team tougher. It initially paid off, and the Barons knocked off three of the NHL's top teams, the Toronto Maple Leafs, New York Islanders and Buffalo Sabres in consecutive games in January 1978. A few weeks later, a record crowd of 13,110 saw the Barons tie the Philadelphia Flyers 2–2. It did not last; they only won a total of four games in February and March, crumbling to last place again.

Merger and aftermath
The Gunds aggressively marketed the team, but got little to show for it. The Barons only attracted a total of 7,000 fans during their three-game winning streak in January. They were also unable to get favorable deals for radio or television, denying them another potential revenue stream. After the season, the Gunds tried to buy the Coliseum, but failed. (They would later succeed in buying the Coliseum, and eventually bought the Cavaliers from Ted Stepien in 1983). 

With the Barons barely registering on Cleveland's sports landscape, the Gunds reluctantly decided to write off them off as a lost cause and search for a way out. Years later, Gordon Gund recalled that the decision to euthanize the team was especially painful given his family's roots in Cleveland.  Kenneth Schnitzer, owner of the WHA's Houston Aeros (who were not being included as part of any proposed merger between the two leagues at the time), offered to buy the Barons and relocate them to Houston, but nothing came of it.

Meanwhile, the consortium that owned the Minnesota North Stars was having financial difficulties similar to those faced by the Barons. The Gunds began talks with the North Stars and broached the possibility of merging both teams. The league was initially cool to the idea, but ultimately concluded that it would be far better in the long term to have one team fold rather than two. The league granted final approval for the merger on June 14, 1978. The amalgamated team retained the North Stars' name, colors, and history, with the wealthier Gunds as majority owners.

The NHL finally agreed to absorb the WHA one year later, a development which resulted in a two decade absence of major league hockey in Ohio since the WHA's Cincinnati Stingers were not included in the merger. However, the NHL worked to keep interest in hockey alive in the state. The Pittsburgh Penguins, who from 1978 to 1991 were owned by Northeast Ohio native Edward J. DeBartolo, Sr., played two designated home games at the Richfield Coliseum in the early 1990s before the arena was demolished and the land added to Cuyahoga Valley National Park. The NHL finally returned to Ohio in 2000 with the expansion Columbus Blue Jackets.

Dennis Maruk was the last Baron (and last Golden Seal as well) to be active in the NHL, retiring from the North Stars after the 1988–89 season with 356 goals in 888 games.

With the North Stars continuing to struggle financially, the Gunds began looking to bring NHL hockey back to the Bay Area. By the late 1980s, they sought to relocate the North Stars but were blocked by the league. In 1991, the Gunds were granted an expansion franchise in San Jose, which became the San Jose Sharks, in return for selling their stake in the North Stars to a group led by Hartford Whalers' founder Howard Baldwin. As a compromise, the league arranged a special dispersal and expansion draft in which the Sharks claimed 16 North Stars players in a dispersal draft, with both teams then allowed to choose players in an expansion draft.

Although the Sharks are officially a separate franchise from the Seals/Golden Seals/Barons, the arrangement effectively reversed the original Barons-North Stars merger, with the Sharks occupying the same market as the Golden Seals prior to their move to Cleveland. The new North Stars owners ultimately moved their team to Dallas as the Dallas Stars in 1993. The Gunds also later moved an existing American Hockey League team from Lexington, Kentucky, to Cleveland, operating the Cleveland Barons from 2001 to 2006 as the Sharks' minor league affiliate.

Season-by-season record
Note: GP = Games played, W = Wins, L = Losses, T = Ties, Pts = Points, GF = Goals for, GA = Goals against, PIM = Penalties in minutes

Broadcasters
In their two years in Cleveland, Larry Hirsch served as the Barons' radio play-by-play announcer on WJW. On the television side, WUAB channel 43 did a very limited schedule with Steve Albert and Dick Hammer on commentary in 1976–77, and perhaps only one game in 1977–78 with Charlie Steiner and Pete Franklin on commentary.

Notable players

Team captains
 Jim Neilson and Bob Stewart, 1976–1978  (co-captains)

First round draft picks
 1976: Bjorn Johansson (fifth overall) selection made by California Golden Seals as the move to Cleveland had not yet taken place
 1977: Mike Crombeen (fifth overall)

Head coach
 Jack Evans, 1976–1978

General managers
 Bill McCreary, 1976–1977
 Harry Howell, 1977–1978

See also
 List of Cleveland Barons players
 List of Cleveland Barons draft picks
 List of NHL seasons

References

Bibliography

Further reading

 

 
Defunct National Hockey League teams
1976 establishments in Ohio
1978 disestablishments in Ohio